Raja Al Hoceima are a Moroccan football club, based in the town of Al Hoceima, a Riffian city in northern Morocco. The football club plays in the Botola 2, the second-highest division in Moroccan professional football. Raja Al Hoceima plays its matches in the Stade Mimoun Al Arsi, a stadium which houses 12,000 seats.

History 
Founded in 1995, Raja Al Hoceima were promoted in 2009 to the Botola 2 for the first time in their history. The football club managed to end ninth in their first season.

Honours 

Champion du Maroc GNFA 1 – Groupe Est: 1
2009

Football clubs in Morocco
Association football clubs established in 1995
1995 establishments in Morocco
Sports clubs in Morocco